Seloi Malere is a suco in Aileu subdistrict, Aileu District, East Timor. The administrative area covers an area of 13 square kilometres and at the time of the 2010 census it had a population of 3676 people.

References

Populated places in Aileu District
Sucos of East Timor